Sylvain Chavanel (born 30 June 1979) is a French former professional road bicycle racer, who rode professionally between 2000 and 2018 for the , ,  and two spells with the / team. His brother Sébastien Chavanel also rode as a professional cyclist. Sylvain Chavanel was noted as a strong all-rounder who won both sprints and time-trials, and was a good northern classics rider, taking 45 wins during his professional career.

Background
Chavanel was born in Châtellerault, France, although his family roots are in Spain. His great-grandparents were from Huesca, in the Aragon region. His grandfather was born in Barcelona and moved to Châtellerault during the Spanish Civil War. Other members of the family still live in Aragon.
He said: "Last year [2007], when the Vuelta was in Zaragoza, I got to know the cousin of mine using a journalist as the translator and she gave me a picture of my grandfather when he was young. Despite my origins, I hardly know a word of Spanish – just swear words".

As a child he played in the garden with models of racing cyclists. He said:

We've got quite a big family and we're all into cycling. I remember playing out in the garden with my three brothers and sister with little figures that we gave names to. I was usually Greg LeMond, then later I went on to be Miguel Induráin then eventually Laurent Jalabert. I remember LeMond's accent. I liked the way he spoke French. I just thought he was a nice guy and I liked his style of riding.
Chavanel began cycling at Châtellerault school when he was eight. He gave up to try football, then went back.

I started cycling again at 12 and from then on I improved every year. I was a fragile little thing, immature physically. I used to finish races halfway down the girls' field and at the back of the boys'. Everything changed the day that I beat my elder brother, Frédéric, in the cadet category, although he was better than me at the time.

Racing career
He began racing when he was 13. He won 29 races on the road as a schoolboy and a junior. He won the national junior individual pursuit championship in 1997. His uncle, Philippe Raby, a former rider in the Vendée region, recommended him to Jean-René Bernaudeau who was building a professional team based there. Bernardeau saw Chavanel race for the first time at Montreveau, in Maine-et-Loire, when he was racing against riders from Bernardeau's Vendée U junior team.

Bonjour (2000–2004)
Bernardeau and Chavanel agreed that Chavanel would spend another year with his club, AC Châtellerault, which had spent time and money on his training. Bernardeau's assistant, Thierry Bricau, was given the job of providing Chavanel with a training programme. Chavanel rode the Tour de l'Avenir in 1999 and then in 2000, aged 21, he turned professional for Bernardeau's Bonjour team, sponsored by a chain of local newspapers. He won the first stage of the Circuit Franco-Belge and lost his leader's jersey only on the last day. He also won the climbers' jersey in the Tour de l'Avenir by breaking clear in the Pyrenees and rode  alone at the front of Paris–Tours.

Bernardeau said:

Sylvain has some of the faults I had as a young rider. He's always working at the front of the race – you have to rein him in for his own good. At his age, life is beautiful and risks are there to be taken. But he's acquiring self-knowledge and his days of gratuitous long-range sorties and suicide attacks are coming to an end.

Chavanel rode his first Tour de France at 22, finishing 65th, later coming third in the Tour de l'Avenir behind Denis Menchov and Florent Brard. In 2002 he won the Four Days of Dunkirk and finished third in the Tour of Belgium. He later won both of those races in 2005.

Cofidis (2005–2008)
On 25 July 2008 Chavanel won the 19th stage of the Tour de France by outsprinting Jérémy Roy at Montluçon. That and other performances brought him election as the most combative rider of the race.

On 3 September 2008, he came second in the individual time trial stage of the Vuelta a España at Ciudad Real. His ride brought him to second place overall, two seconds slower than the American, Levi Leipheimer. His team worked for him next day from Ciudad Real to Toledo to make sure he won time bonuses offered along the route. The six seconds he collected were enough to give him the leader's jersey on 4 September.

Quick Step (2009–2013)
Chavanel said in 2007 that he had had offers from foreign teams but was discouraged from joining them because he was unsure of his pension payments outside France. In July 2008 he said he had agreed with Patrick Lefevere the directeur sportif to join the  team in Belgium for 2009. Chavanel said he made his decision to move after riding well in classic races in Belgium at the start of the year. He won Dwars door Vlaanderen and the Brabantse Pijl. He said:

I had other options as well. Professionally, it's an experience that can only do me good. I had the chance to sign for three years with AG2R-La Mondiale but I had the feeling that I wasn't going to develop enough. I have always raced in France and, in my heart, some experience abroad has excited me for some time. I therefore decided to take the step and Patrick Lefévère's advances completely persuaded me.

During the 2010 Tour de France, Chavanel took over the yellow jersey after attacking at the  mark on stage 2. Following a series of crashes affecting the General Classification contenders on the descent into Spa, the race was neutralized for every rider except Chavanel, who was the lone escapee at that time. He capitalized on that, opening up enough of a gap to win the stage and capture the yellow jersey from Fabian Cancellara. The following stage was not so good for Chavanel as two punctures on the cobbled roads meant Fabian Cancellara re-took the yellow jersey, however on the Tour's first mountain stage from Tournus to Station des Rousses Chavanel bridged the gap to an early breakaway and rode away to take a famous win and inherit the yellow jersey for the second time.

In the 2011 Vuelta a España Chavanel held the red leader's jersey for four stages. On stage three, as part of a breakaway, he finished second behind Pablo Lastras which left him second in general classification, 20 seconds behind Lastras.
However, on the next stage Chavanel finished just 57 seconds behind the stage winner while Lastras lost over 18 minutes, thereby making Chavanel the overall leader of the Vuelta. He held this jersey until stage 8 where it was taken by Joaquim Rodríguez.

In 2012, Chavanel won the Three Days of De Panne and won the French National Time Trial Championships for the fourth time.

In 2013, after strong appearances in the Tour de San Luis and the Volta ao Algarve, Chavanel won stage six of Paris–Nice, taking the points classification at the race. Chavanel also won the overall classification at the Three Days of De Panne for the second year in a row, winning the final time trial stage.

After five years with the team, Chavanel left the squad at the end of the 2013 season, and joined  for the 2014 season.

IAM (2014–2015)
After winning the National Time trial title, Chavanel went on to win the 2014 Tour du Poitou-Charentes thanks to a great performance in the stage 4 time trial. A couple of days later, Chavanel topped a very successful week as he prevailed in the World Tour race GP Ouest-France by winning the sprint out of a small group ahead of Arthur Vichot. In 2015 he also accomplished the impressive feat of starting and finishing each Grand Tour.

Direct Énergie (2016–2018)
In September 2015  announced that Chavanel would join them for the 2016 season. In 2018, Chavanel participated in the Tour de France for the 18th time to take the record outright from Stuart O'Grady and Jens Voigt for the most Tour de France participations and was given the most combative rider award for the second stage. On 26 July 2018, Chavanel finished Stage 18 of the race to break the record for most number of stages completed – overtaking Joop Zoetemelk's 365. Three days later, he tied Zoetemelk's record of finishing the Tour de France 16 times and set the new record stages completed number at 369. On the last day of the race, 29 July, he announced he would retire after Tour de Vendée on 6 October 2018. He extended his career to the following week's Chrono des Nations before retiring.

Nickname
Chavanel was known as Chava, Mimosa or Mimo, after a French film character he imitated. In the Dutch-speaking Belgian media, he was nicknamed 'La Machine' for his outstanding stamina and determination.

Major results

1999
 7th Overall Circuit des Mines
2000
 1st Mountains classification Tour de l'Avenir
 3rd Overall Circuit Franco-Belge
1st Stage 1
 6th Overall Tour de l'Ain
 6th Grand Prix de Villers-Cotterêts
 8th Grand Prix de la Ville de Lillers
2001
 2nd Châteauroux Classic
 3rd Overall Tour de l'Avenir
 3rd Polynormande
 4th Overall Tour de l'Ain
 6th Overall Tour de Picardie
 7th Overall Circuit Franco-Belge
 9th Le Samyn
2002
 1st  Overall Four Days of Dunkirk
 1st Trophée des Grimpeurs
 2nd Overall Tour du Poitou-Charentes
 3rd Overall Tour of Belgium
 3rd Châteauroux Classic
 9th Overall Danmark Rundt
2003
 1st Tour du Haut Var
 2nd Overall Tour du Poitou-Charentes
 2nd Grand Prix de Plumelec-Morbihan
 3rd Overall Tour Méditerranéen
 5th Overall Paris–Nice
 5th Overall Critérium International
 5th Overall Circuit de la Sarthe
1st Stage 3b (ITT)
 5th Paris–Bourges
 9th Overall Paris–Corrèze
 9th Tro-Bro Léon
2004
 1st  Overall Tour of Belgium
 1st  Overall Four Days of Dunkirk
 1st Polynormande
 Tour du Poitou-Charentes
1st Stages 3 & 4 (ITT)
 5th Paris–Camembert
 5th Trophée des Grimpeurs
 6th Grand Prix de Fourmies
 9th Overall Tour Méditerranéen
 10th Overall Critérium International
2005
 1st  Time trial, National Road Championships
 1st  Overall Circuit de la Sarthe
1st Stage 5
 1st  Overall Tour du Poitou-Charentes
 1st Duo Normand (with Thierry Marichal)
 9th Overall Tour de Pologne
2006
 1st  Time trial, National Road Championships
 1st  Overall Tour du Poitou-Charentes
 7th Overall Paris–Corrèze
 7th Paris–Bourges
 8th Gran Premio di Lugano
2007
 3rd Trophée des Grimpeurs
 4th Overall Critérium International
 9th Grand Prix de Plumelec-Morbihan
 10th Overall Critérium du Dauphiné Libéré
2008
 1st  Time trial, National Road Championships
 1st Dwars door Vlaanderen
 1st Brabantse Pijl
 Tour de France
1st Stage 19
 Combativity award Stages 2, 6 & 19
 Winner Super Combativity award
 1st Stage 5 Tour Méditerranéen
 1st Stage 4 Volta a Catalunya
 2nd Overall Volta ao Algarve
 8th Overall Paris–Nice
1st Stage 6
 10th Time trial, UCI Road World Championships
2009
 2nd Time trial, National Road Championships
 2nd Overall Eneco Tour
1st Prologue
 2nd Overall Volta ao Algarve
 3rd Overall Paris–Nice
1st  Points classification
1st Stage 3
 4th Grote Prijs Jef Scherens
 5th E3 Prijs Vlaanderen
 7th Paris–Roubaix
 7th Dwars door Vlaanderen
 9th Kuurne–Brussels–Kuurne
2010
 Tour de France
1st Stages 2 & 7
Held  after Stages 2 & 7
Held  after Stage 2
 Combativity award Stage 2 & Overall
 2nd Time trial, National Road Championships
 7th Overall Tour du Limousin
2011
 1st  Road race, National Road Championships
 2nd Tour of Flanders
 4th Overall Three Days of De Panne
 Vuelta a España
Held  after Stages 4–7
2012
 1st  Team time trial, UCI Road World Championships
 1st  Time trial, National Road Championships
 1st  Overall Three Days of De Panne
1st Stage 3b (ITT)
 2nd Overall Eneco Tour
 2nd Dwars door Vlaanderen
 2nd Chrono des Nations
 8th Overall Paris–Nice
 8th Overall Tour de San Luis
 10th Tour of Flanders
2013
 1st  Team time trial, UCI Road World Championships
 National Road Championships
1st  Time trial
2nd Road race
 1st  Overall Three Days of De Panne
1st Stage 3b (ITT)
 3rd Chrono des Nations
 4th Milan–San Remo
 4th Brabantse Pijl
 5th Overall Paris–Nice
1st  Points classification
1st Stage 6
 6th Overall Eneco Tour
1st Stage 5 (ITT)
 6th E3 Harelbeke
 7th Omloop Het Nieuwsblad
 8th Grand Prix de Wallonie
2014
 1st  Time trial, National Road Championships
 1st  Overall Tour du Poitou-Charentes
1st Stage 4 (ITT)
 1st GP Ouest–France
 1st Chrono des Nations
 2nd Overall Four Days of Dunkirk
1st Stage 3
 3rd Overall Tour of Belgium
 5th Dwars door Vlaanderen
 7th Overall Tour Méditerranéen
 7th Overall Tour of Britain
2015
 1st  Individual pursuit, National Track Championships
 National Road Championships
3rd Time trial
3rd Road race
 9th Overall Vuelta a Andalucía
2016
 2016–17 UCI Track Cycling World Cup, Glasgow
1st  Individual pursuit
2nd  Team pursuit
 1st  Team pursuit, UEC European Track Championships
 1st  Individual pursuit, National Track Championships
 1st  Overall Tour du Poitou-Charentes
1st Stage 4 (ITT)
 4th Overall Étoile de Bessèges
1st Stage 3
 5th Overall Three Days of De Panne
2017
 4th Time trial, National Road Championships
 4th Overall Three Days of De Panne
 5th Overall Four Days of Dunkirk
1st Stage 4
 5th Overall Étoile de Bessèges
 9th Tour of Flanders
 9th Tro-Bro Léon
 10th Chrono des Nations
  Combativity award Stage 16 Tour de France
2018
 2nd Overall Tour Poitou-Charentes en Nouvelle-Aquitaine
 4th Overall Étoile de Bessèges
 4th Overall Tour La Provence
 5th Cholet-Pays de Loire
 5th Chrono des Nations
 6th La Roue Tourangelle
 6th Paris–Chauny
  Combativity award Stage 2 Tour de France

Grand Tour general classification results timeline

Classics results timeline

References

External links

 
 
 
 
 
 Tour de France results
 Palmares at Cycling Base
 Chavanel pakt eindzege Driedaagse na winst in tijdrit

1979 births
Living people
French male cyclists
French Tour de France stage winners
Olympic cyclists of France
Cyclists at the 2004 Summer Olympics
Cyclists at the 2012 Summer Olympics
People from Châtellerault
2010 Tour de France stage winners
UCI Road World Champions (elite men)
Sportspeople from Vienne
French people of Spanish descent
Cyclists from Nouvelle-Aquitaine